Almagro Club de Fútbol is a Spanish football club based in Almagro, in the autonomous community of Castile-La Mancha. Currently plays in Tercera División – Group 18, holding home games at Estadio Manuel Trujillo, with a 2,000-seat capacity.

Recent seasons

12 seasons in Tercera Division

References

External links
Official website 
FFCM team profile 

Football clubs in Castilla–La Mancha
Association football clubs established in 1957
1957 establishments in Spain
Almagro, Ciudad Real